The Westland Whirlwind was a British twin-engined fighter developed by Westland Aircraft. A contemporary of the Supermarine Spitfire and Hawker Hurricane, it was the first single-seat, twin-engined, cannon-armed fighter of the Royal Air Force.

When it first flew in 1938, the Whirlwind was one of the fastest combat aircraft in the world and with four 20 mm Hispano-Suiza HS.404 autocannon in its nose, the most heavily armed. Protracted development problems with its Rolls-Royce Peregrine engines delayed the project and only 114 Whirlwinds were built. During the Second World War, only three RAF squadrons were equipped with the aircraft and, despite its success as a fighter and ground attack aircraft, it was withdrawn from service in 1943.

Design and development

By the mid-1930s, aircraft designers around the world perceived that increased attack speeds were imposing shorter firing times on fighter pilots. This implied less ammunition hitting the target and ensuring destruction. Instead of two rifle-calibre machine guns, six or eight were required; studies had shown that eight machine guns could deliver 256 rounds per second. The eight machine guns installed in the Hurricane fired rifle-calibre rounds, which did not deliver enough damage to quickly knock out an opponent, and were dispersed at ranges other than that at which they were harmonised. Cannon, such as the French 20 mm Hispano-Suiza HS.404, which could fire explosive ammunition, offered more firepower and attention turned to aircraft designs which could carry four cannon. While the most agile fighter aircraft were generally small and light, their meagre fuel capacity limited their range and tended to restrict them to defensive and interception roles. The larger airframes and bigger fuel loads of twin-engined designs were favoured for long-range, offensive roles.

The first British specification for a high-performance machine-gun monoplane was Air Ministry specification F.5/34 for a radial-engined fighter for use in the tropics which led to four aircraft designs  but the aircraft produced were overtaken by the development of the new Hawker and Supermarine fighters. The RAF Air Staff thought that an experimental aircraft armed with the 20 mm cannon was needed urgently and specification F.37/35 was issued to British aircraft companies in 1935. The specification called for a single-seat day and night fighter armed with four cannon.

Eight aircraft designs from five companies were submitted in response to the specification. Boulton Paul offered the P.88A and P.88B (two related single engine designs differing in engine: Bristol Hercules radial or Rolls-Royce Vulture in-line respectively), Bristol the single-engined Type 153 with cannon in wings and the twin-engined Type 153A with cannon in nose. Hawker offered a variant of the Hurricane, the Supermarine Type 312 was a variant of Spitfire and the Supermarine Type 313 a twin-engined (Rolls-Royce Goshawk or Hispano 12Y) design with four guns in the nose and potentially a further two firing through the propeller hubs if the 12T was used, the Westland P.9 had two Rolls-Royce Kestrel K.26 engines and a twin tail.

When the designs were considered in May 1936, there was concern that on the one hand a two engine design would be less manoeuvrable than a single-engined design and on the other that uneven recoil from cannon set in the wings would give less accurate fire. The conference favoured two engines with the cannon set in the nose and recommended the Supermarine 313. Although Supermarine's efforts were favoured due to their success with fast aircraft and the promise of the Spitfire which was undergoing trials, neither they nor Hawker were in a position to deliver a modified version of their single-engined designs quickly enough - over two years for Supermarine. Westland, which had less work and was further advanced in their project, was chosen along with the P.88 and the Type 313 for construction. A contract for two P.9s was placed in February 1937 which were expected to be flying in mid-1938. The P.88s were ordered in December along with a Supermarine design to F37/35 but both were cancelled in January.

The Westland design team, under the new leadership of W. E. W. "Teddy" Petter designed an aircraft that employed state-of-the-art technology. The monocoque fuselage was tubular, with a T-tail at the end, although as originally conceived, the design featured a twin tail, which was discarded when large Fowler flaps were added that caused large areas of turbulence over the tail unit. By the employment of the T-tail, the elevator was moved up out of the way of the disturbed airflow caused when the flaps were down. Handley Page slats were fitted to the outer wings and to the leading edge of the radiator openings; these were interconnected by duraluminium torque tubes. In June 1941, the slats were wired shut on the recommendation of the Chief Investigator of the Accident Investigation Branch, after two Whirlwinds crashed when the outer slats failed during vigorous manoeuvres; tests by the Aeroplane and Armament Experimental Establishment (A&AEE) confirmed that the Whirlwind's take-off and landing was largely unaffected with the slats locked shut, while the flight characteristics improved under the conditions in which the slats normally deployed.

The engines were developments of the Rolls-Royce Kestrel K.26, later renamed Peregrine. The first prototype, L6844, used long exhaust ducts that were channelled through the wings and fuel tanks, exiting at the wing's trailing edge. This configuration was quickly changed to more conventional, external exhausts after Westland's chief test pilot Harald Penrose nearly lost control when an exhaust duct broke and heat-fractured an aileron control rod. The engines were cooled by ducted radiators, which were set into the leading edges of the wing centre-sections to reduce drag. The airframe was built mainly of stressed-skin duralumin, with the exception of the rear-fuselage, which used a magnesium alloy stressed skin. With the pilot sitting high under one of the world's first full bubble canopies and the low and forward location of the wing, all round visibility was good (except for directly over the nose). Four 20 mm cannon were mounted in the nose; the 600 lb/minute fire rate made it the most heavily armed fighter aircraft of its era. The clustering of the weapons also meant that there were no convergence problems as with wing-mounted guns. Hopes were so high for the design that it remained top secret for much of its development, although it had already been mentioned in the French press.

L6844 first flew on 11 October 1938, construction having been delayed chiefly due to the new features and also because of the late delivery of the engines and undercarriage. L6844 was passed to RAE Farnborough at the end of the year, while further service trials were later carried out at Martlesham Heath. The Whirlwind exhibited excellent handling characteristics and proved to be very easy to fly at all speeds. The only exception was the inadequate directional control during take-off which necessitated an increased rudder area above the tailplane.

The Whirlwind was quite small, only slightly larger than the Hurricane but with a smaller frontal area. The landing gear was fully retractable and the entire aircraft had a very clean finish with few openings or protuberances. Radiators were in the leading edge on the inner wings rather than below the engines, which contributed to the overheating problems. The aircraft had short range, under  combat radius, which made it as marginal as an escort as the Hurricane and Spitfire. The first deliveries of Peregrine engines did not reach Westland until January 1940.

By late 1940, the Spitfire was scheduled to mount  cannon so the "cannon-armed" requirement was being met and by this time, the role of escort fighters was becoming less important as RAF Bomber Command turned to night flying. The main qualities the RAF were looking for in a twin-engine fighter were range and carrying capacity (to allow the large radar apparatus of the time to be carried), in which requirements the Bristol Beaufighter could perform just as well as or even better than the Whirlwind.

Production orders were contingent on the success of the test programme; although ACAS was impressed by the design the highly experimental design needed careful examination. Delays caused by over 250 modifications to the two prototypes led to an initial production order for 200 aircraft being held up until January 1939, followed by a second order for a similar number, deliveries to fighter squadrons being scheduled to begin in September 1940. Earlier, due to the lower expected production at Westland, there had been suggestions that production should be by other firms (Fairey or Hawker) and an early 1939 plan to build 800 of them at the Castle Bromwich shadow factory was dropped in favour of Spitfire production; instead a further 200 would be built by Westland.

Despite the Whirlwind's promise, production ended in January 1942, after the completion of just 112 production aircraft (plus the two prototypes). Rolls-Royce needed to concentrate on the development and production of the Merlin engine, and the troubled Vulture engines, rather than the Peregrine. Westland was aware that its design – which had been built around the Peregrine – was incapable of using anything larger without an extensive redesign. After the cancellation of the Whirlwind, Petter campaigned for the development of a Whirlwind Mk II, which was to have been powered by an improved  Peregrine, with a better, higher-altitude supercharger, also using 100 octane fuel, with an increased boost rating. This proposal was aborted when Rolls-Royce cancelled work on the Peregrine. Building a Whirlwind consumed three times as much alloy as a Spitfire.

Operational history

Many pilots who flew the Whirlwind praised its performance. Sergeant G. L. Buckwell of 263 Squadron, who was shot down in a Whirlwind over Cherbourg, later commented that the Whirlwind was "great to fly – we were a privileged few... In retrospect the lesson of the Whirlwind is clear... A radical aircraft requires either prolonged development or widespread service to exploit its concept and eliminate its weaknesses. Too often in World War II, such aircraft suffered accelerated development or limited service, with the result that teething difficulties came to be regarded as permanent limitations". Another 263 Squadron pilot said "It was regarded with absolute confidence and affection". By comparison the test pilot Eric Brown described the aircraft as "under-powered" and "a great disappointment".

An aspect of the type often criticised was the high landing speed imposed by the wing design. Because of the low production level, based on the number of Peregrines available, no redesign of the wing was contemplated, although Westland did test the effectiveness of leading-edge slats to reduce speeds. When the slats were activated with such force that they were ripped off the wings, the slats were wired shut.

As the performance of the Peregrine engines fell off at altitude, the Whirlwind was most often used in ground-attack missions over France, attacking German airfields, marshalling yards, and railway traffic. The Whirlwind was used to particularly good effect as a gun platform for destroying locomotives. Some pilots were credited with several trains damaged or destroyed in a mission. The aircraft was also successful in hunting and destroying German E-boats which operated in the English Channel. At lower altitudes, it could hold its own against the Messerschmitt Bf 109. Though the Peregrine was a much-maligned engine, it was more reliable than the troubled Napier Sabre engine used in the Hawker Typhoon, the Whirlwind's successor. The twin engines meant that seriously damaged aircraft were able to return with one engine knocked out. The placement of the wings and engines ahead of the cockpit allowed the aircraft to absorb a great deal of damage, while the cockpit area remained largely intact. The rugged frame of the Whirlwind gave pilots greater protection than contemporary aircraft during crash landings and ground accidents. According to P. J. R. Moyes

The first Whirlwinds went to 25 Squadron based at North Weald. The squadron was fully equipped with radar-equipped Bristol Blenheim IF night fighters when Squadron Leader K. A. K. MacEwen flew prototype Whirlwind L6845 from RAF Boscombe Down to RAF North Weald on 30 May 1940. The following day it was flown and inspected by four of the squadron's pilots and the next day was inspected by the Secretary of State for Air, Sir Archibald Sinclair and Lord Trenchard. The first two production Whirlwinds were delivered in June to 25 Squadron for night-flying trials. It was then decided to re-equip 25 Squadron with the two-seat Bristol Beaufighter night fighter, as it was already an operational night fighter squadron.

The first Whirlwind squadron would be 263 Squadron, which was reforming at RAF Grangemouth, after disastrous losses in the Norwegian Campaign. The first production Whirlwind was delivered to 263 Squadron by its commander, Squadron Leader H. Eeles on 6 July. Deliveries were slow, with only five on strength with 263 Squadron on 17 August 1940 and none serviceable. (The squadron supplemented its strength with Hawker Hurricanes to allow the squadron's pilots to fly in the meantime.) Despite the Battle of Britain and the consequent urgent need for fighters, 263 Squadron remained in Scotland, Air Chief Marshal Hugh Dowding, in charge of RAF Fighter Command, stated on 17 October that 263 could not be deployed to the south because "there was no room for 'passengers' in that part of the world".

The first Whirlwind was written off on 7 August when Pilot Officer McDermott had a tyre blow out while taking off in P6966. In spite of this he managed to get the aircraft airborne. Flying Control advised him of the dangerous condition of his undercarriage. PO McDermott bailed out of the aircraft between Grangemouth and Stirling. The aircraft dived in and buried itself eight feet into the ground. On recent inspection of the salvaged wreck of P6966, it was noticed that the defective tyre fitted was not of the correct size for a Whirlwind. Instead, it was the correct size for a Hurricane which 263 Squadron was also flying.

No. 263 Squadron moved south to RAF Exeter and was declared operational with the Whirlwind on 7 December 1940. Initial operations consisted of convoy patrols and anti E-boat missions. The Whirlwind's first confirmed kill occurred on 8 February 1941, when an Arado Ar 196 floatplane was shot down; the Whirlwind responsible also crashed into the sea and the pilot was killed. From then on the squadron was to have considerable success with the Whirlwind while flying against enemy Junkers Ju 88, Dornier Do 217, Messerschmitt Bf 109s and Focke-Wulf Fw 190s.

263 Squadron also occasionally carried out day bomber escort missions with the Whirlwinds. One example was when they formed part of the escort of 54 Blenheims on a low-level raid against power stations near Cologne on 12 August 1941; owing to the relatively short range of the escorts, including the Whirlwinds, the fighters turned back near Antwerp, with the bombers continuing on without escort. Ten Blenheims were lost.

The squadron mostly flew low-level attack sorties across the channel ("Rhubarbs" against ground targets and "Roadstead" attacks against shipping). The Whirlwind proved a match for German fighters at low level, as demonstrated on 6 August 1941, when four Whirlwinds on an anti-shipping strike were intercepted by a large formation of Messerschmitt Bf 109s and claimed three Bf 109s destroyed for no losses. A second Whirlwind squadron, 137, formed in September 1941, specialising in attacks against railway targets. In the summer of 1942, both squadrons were fitted with racks to carry two  bombs, and nicknamed 'Whirlibombers'. These undertook low-level cross-channel "Rhubarb" sweeps, attacking locomotives, bridges, shipping and other targets.

The worst losses of 137 Squadron occurred on 12 February 1942 when they were sent to escort five British destroyers, unaware of the escaping German warships Scharnhorst and Gneisenau making the Channel Dash to safer ports. They descended to investigate and were immediately jumped by about 20 Bf 109 fighters of Jagdgeschwader 2. The Whirlwinds shot at anything in their sights but were heavily outnumbered. While this was happening, at 13:40, two more Whirlwinds were sent up to relieve the first four and two more Whirlwinds took off at 14:25; four of the eight Whirlwinds failed to return.

From 24 October until 26 November 1943, Whirlwinds of 263 Squadron made several heavy attacks against the German blockade runner Münsterland, in dry dock at Cherbourg. As many as 12 Whirlwinds participated at a time in dive bombing attacks carried out from  using  bombs. The attacks were met by very heavy anti-aircraft fire but virtually all bombs fell within  of the target; only one Whirlwind was lost during the attacks.

The last Whirlwind mission to be flown by 137 Squadron was on 21 June 1943, when five Whirlwinds took off on a "Rhubarb" attack against the German airfield at Poix. P6993 was unable to locate the target and instead bombed a supply train north of Rue. While returning, the starboard throttle jammed in the fully open position and the engine eventually lost power. It made a forced landing in a field next to RAF Manston but the aircraft was a write-off, although, as in many other crash landings in the type, the pilot walked away unhurt.

No. 263 Squadron, the first and last squadron to operate the Whirlwind, flew its last Whirlwind mission on 29 November 1943, turning in their aeroplanes and converting to the Hawker Typhoon in December that year. On 1 January 1944, the type was declared obsolete. The remaining serviceable aircraft were transferred to No. 18 Maintenance Unit, while those undergoing repairs or overhaul were allowed to be repaired only if they were in near-flyable condition. An official letter forbade aircraft needing repair to be worked on.

[[File:Whirlwind Mk I, 263 Sqn Exeter, in flight over West Country.jpg|thumb|P6969 'HE-V of 263 in flight over the West Country]]
The aircraft was summed up by Francis Mason as follows:

VariantsP.9 prototypeSingle-seat twin-engine fighter aircraft prototype. Two built (L6844 and L6845), can be distinguished from later production samples by the mudguards above the wheels (as did the first production sample, P6966), the exhaust system and the so-called 'acorn' on the joint between fin and rudder. L6844 had a distinctive downward kink to the front of its pitot tube, atop the tail not seen again in following models. L6844's colour was dark grey. L6844 had opposite-rotation engines, L6845 had engines that rotated in the same direction; this carried over to production machines.Whirlwind ISingle-seat twin-engine fighter aircraft, 400 ordered, 2 prototypes were built and 114 productions were built, 116 were built.Whirlwind IISingle-seat twin-engine fighter-bomber aircraft, fitted with underwing bomb racks, were nicknamed "Whirlibombers". At least 67 conversions made from the original Mk I fighter.Experimental variantsA Mk I Whirlwind was tested as a night fighter in 1940 with No. 25 Squadron.
The first prototype was armed with an experimental twelve 0.303 (7.7 mm) machine guns and another one 37 mm cannon.Green 1961, p. 125.Merlin variantWestland proposed fitting Merlin engines in a letter to Air Marshal Sholto Douglas. The proposal was rejected but Westland used the design work already performed in developing the Welkin high-altitude fighter.

Operators Royal Air Force
 No. 25 Squadron RAF tested three aircraft between May and July 1940. (might have carried code letters "ZK")
 No. 263 Squadron RAF operated Whirlwinds between July 1940 and December 1943. Aircraft had applied the squadron's "HE" code letters.
 No. 137 Squadron RAF operated Whirlwinds between September 1941 and June 1943. Aircraft had applied the squadron's "SF" code letters.US Navy'''
One aircraft P6994 was sent to the US for trials in June 1942 and survived there until at least late 1944.

Survivors
After retirement in December 1943, all but one of the surviving Whirlwinds were sent to No. 18 Maintenance Unit RAF at Dumfries, Scotland, where they were scrapped. P7048 was retained by Westland and was granted a civil certificate of airworthiness on 10 October 1946, with the registration G-AGOI. It was used as a company hack for a short time before being withdrawn in 1947 and scrapped.Buttler 2002, p. 16. In October 1979, the remains of Whirlwind P6966, the first Whirlwind to be lost, were recovered near Grangemouth by enthusiasts in a dig group. The two Peregrine engines were recovered, as well as many pieces of the airframe. The Whirlwind Fighter Project began building a full-scale replica Whirlwind in 2011–2012, with the intention to have it built in approximately four years though dependent on the volunteers and funding. Plans for a 2/3 scale replica were marketed for home building in the late 1970s and early 1980s as the Butterworth Westland Whirlwind.

Specifications (Whirlwind I)

See also

References

Notes

Citations

Bibliography
 Air Ministry. Pilot's Notes: The Whirlwind I Aeroplane, Two Peregrine I Engines. Air Publication 1709A. London, UK: Air Ministry, June 1940.
 Bingham, Victor. Whirlwind, The Westland Whirlwind Fighter. Shrewsbury, UK: Airlife Publishing Ltd., 1987. .
 Buttler, Tony. British Secret Projects: Fighters and Bombers 1935–1950. Earl Shilton, Leicester, UK: Midland, 2004. .
 Buttler, Tony. "Reap The Whirlwind: Britain's Pioneer Cannon Fighter". Air Enthusiast. No. 99, May/June 2002, pp. 2–16. .
 Cordury, Niall. Whirlwind; Westland's Enigmatic Fighter. Stroud, UK: Fonthill Media Limited, 2013. 
 Franks, Richard A. The Westland Whirlwind: A Detailed Guide to the RAF's Twin-engine Fighter (Airframe Album 4). Bedford, UK: Valiant Wings Publishing, 2014. 
 Green, William, ed. "Foremost with Four Cannon." Flying Review International, Volume 19, No. 7, April 1964.
 Green, William. Warplanes of the Second World War, Fighters, Vol. 2. London: Macdonald, 1961.
 Heffernan, Terry. "Something Special from Somerset – Part 2". Aeroplane Monthly. Vol. 13, No. 2, February 1985, pp. 60–64. .
 James, Derek N. Westland Aircraft since 1915. Annapolis, Maryland: Naval Institute Press, 1991. .
 James, Derek N. "Westland's Double Trouble" (Database). Aeroplane, Vol. 34, No. 5, May 2006, pp. 60–73. .
 Mason, Francis K. Royal Air Force Fighters of World War Two, Volume One. Windsor, Berkshire, UK: Hylton Lacy Publishers Ltd., 1969.
 Meekoms, K. J. and E. B Morgan. The British Aircraft Specifications File: British Military and Commercial Aircraft Specifications 1920–1949. Tonbridge, Kent, UK: Air-Britain (Historians) Ltd., 1994. 
 Moyes, Philip J.R. Westland Whirlwind (Profile No. 191). London: Profile Publications, 1967.
 Price, Alfred. "The Vortex from Yeovil: The Story of the Westland Whirlwind Fighter". Air International. Vol. 48 No. 3, March 1995, pp. 157–164. .
 Richards, Denis. The Hardest Victory: RAF Bomber Command in the Second World War. London: Coronet, 1995. .
 
 Robertson, Bruce. Westland Whirlwind Described. Dandenong, Victoria, Australia: Kookaburra Technical Publications, 1970. 
 

Further reading
 Crawford, Alex and Phil H. Listemann. "Westland Whirlwind Mk.I." (Allied Wings No.4). London: Casemate Pub & Book Dist. Llc, 2008. 
 Green, William and Gordon Swanborough. WW2 Aircraft Fact Files – RAF Fighters, Part 3. London: Jane's, 1981. 
 Hall, Alan W. Westland Whirlwind F.Mk.I (Warpaint Series no.54). Luton, Berfordshire, UK: Warpaint Books, 2006. No ISBN.
 James, Derek N. Westland (Images of England). Gloucestershire, UK: Tempus Publishing Ltd., 1997. 
 James, Derek N. Westland: A History. Gloucestershire, UK: Tempus Publishing Ltd., 2002. 
 Mondey, David.  Westland  (Planemakers 2). London: Jane's Publishing Company, 1982. 
 Morgan, Eric B. "Westland P.9 Whirlwind." Twentyfirst Profile, Vol. 2, No. 14. New Milton, Hertfordshire, UK: 21st Profile Ltd. 
 Ovcácík, Michal and Karel Susa.  Westland Whirlwind: Mk.I Fighter, Mk.I fighter-bomber. Prague, Czech Republic: Mark 1 Ltd., 2002. 
 Taylor, John W.R. "Westland Whirlwind" Combat Aircraft of the World from 1909 to the Present. New York: G.P. Putnam's Sons, 1969. 

External links

 The Westland Whirlwind Flight 5 March 1942
 "Flying Arsenal Pace Bombers on Raids." Popular Science, June 1942, p. 65.
 colour profiles
 Aircraft Types and their Characteristics – Whirlwind Flight'' 18 June 1942
 Whirlwind Fighter Project

1930s British fighter aircraft
Whirlwind (Fighter)
Low-wing aircraft
Cruciform tail aircraft
Twin piston-engined tractor aircraft
Aircraft first flown in 1938
World_War_II_British_fighter_aircraft